Miss Scarlet and The Duke is a British-American period crime television drama created by Rachael New, starring Kate Phillips and Stuart Martin as the title characters, two Victorian detectives.

The first series began broadcasting on Alibi on 31 March 2020 and premiered in the US on 17 January 2021, as part of PBS's Masterpiece anthology series. Miss Scarlet and The Duke was the first series that PBS purchased from, or co-produced with, a British channel other than the BBC, Channel 4, or ITV. In Canada, it is available on CBC Gem.

A second series was announced by PBS on 29 March 2021 and started airing on Alibi on 14 June 2022, while the PBS run started on 16 October 2022.

The show was later renewed for series three and four, with series three premiering on PBS on 8 January 2023.

Plot and characters
In Victorian London, 1882, Eliza Scarlet is left almost penniless when her father, Henry, unexpectedly dies. Although marriage would appear to be her only option for financial security, Eliza resolves to continue her father's detective agency alone, working under his name. Struggling to build her reputation in the male-dominated world of crime-solving, she frequently calls on her old friend William Wellington, a gruff detective inspector of Scotland Yard, to help her acquire cases, though she often resorts to stealing case files from his office.

William is known in the police force as "The Duke" or simply "Duke", a nickname referring to the Duke of Wellington. Eliza's late father Henry saved William from the Glasgow streets as a child, and later mentored him through the police academy. As a result, William looked up to Henry as a mentor and father figure. William once kissed Eliza following her mother's death, which he characterises as "a chaste kiss", to her annoyance. Though he is irritated by Eliza's detective aspirations, he cares for her and gradually begins to show respect for her skills.

Eliza also befriends Rupert Parker, a wealthy man who loans her money for her agency as an investment. Rupert is the bachelor (and secretly gay) son of Mrs Parker, who owns Eliza's house, and relies on Eliza's advice to navigate his personal life. Eliza lives with her housekeeper, Ivy, who helped raise her after Eliza's mother died (some time before the series begins). Eliza and William bicker and argue constantly, but also share moments of subtle flirtation and care for each other deeply.

Series writer and creator Rachael New took inspiration for Eliza's character from Elizabeth Bennet, the heroine of Jane Austen's Pride and Prejudice. Born into a middle-class family, Eliza uses her appearance as a refined Victorian lady to her advantage when working on cases. To many people's surprise, however, Eliza is actually clever and feisty, which works in her favour. William and Eliza work on several cases together, though she is uncredited, causing disputes between them. Eliza employs the services of a known criminal, Moses, much to William's annoyance. Moses is amused by Eliza's gumption, and they connect as outsiders to society.

Cast

Overview

Detective agency 
 Kate Phillips as Eliza Scarlet, an ambitious young woman who takes over her late father's detective agency
 Ansu Kabia as Moses, a Jamaican British petty criminal whom Eliza frequently hires as an assistant, informant, or debt collector
 Kevin Doyle as Henry Scarlet (series 1), Eliza's father and William's mentor
 Andrew Gower as Rupert Parker (series 1), Eliza's friend and investor

Police officials 
 Stuart Martin as William "Duke" Wellington, a detective inspector with the Metropolitan Police
 Simon Ludders as Mr Potts (series 1–2, guest series 3), a city coroner, who antagonises Eliza but later romantically pursues Ivy
 Matthew Malone as Clarence Honeychurch (series 1), a police constable
 Danny Midwinter as Frank Jenkins (series 1), William's assistant, a detective sergeant
 Nick Dunning as Superintendent Stirling (series 1), William's supervisor
 Ian Pirie as Superintendent Monro (series 2– ), Stirling's successor
 Evan McCabe as Oliver Fitzroy (series 2– ), a new and untested detective, and the son of the police commissioner
 Tim Chipping as  Phelps (series 2– ), a harsh colleague of William's

Associates 
 Cathy Belton as Ivy Woods, Eliza's housekeeper
 Richard Evans as Herr Hildegard (series 1), a funeral director who works near Eliza's office
 Amy McAllister as Tilly Hildegard (series 1), Herr Hildegard's German niece, who pursues and eventually marries Rupert
 Jessie Cave as Harriet "Hattie" Parker (series 2), Mrs Parker's niece and companion
 Felix Scott as Patrick Nash (recurring, series 2; regular, series 3– ), another private detective
 Brian Bovell as Solomon (guest, series 2; regular, series 3– ), a shopkeeper specialising in exotic poisons
 Sophie Robertson as Arabella Acaster (series 3– ), an old schoolmate who bullied Eliza as a child
 Helen Norton as Mrs Parker (recurring, series 1–2), Eliza's landlady and Rupert's mother
 Oliver Chris as Basil Sinclaire (recurring, series 2– ), a journalist specialising in sensational crime stories
 Laura Rollins as Clementine (recurring, series 2– ), a prostitute and friend of Moses', occasionally hired by Eliza for various tasks

Episodes

Series 1 (2020)

Series 2 (2022)

Series 3 (2023)

Notes

Production
Although set in London, the first series was shot in Dublin, Ireland. The street where Eliza Scarlet lives is Mount Pleasant Square, Ranelagh, Dublin 6. The distinctive green dome of Mary Immaculate, Refuge of Sinners Church, Rathmines is visible in some street scenes. The police station where the Duke works is the CBS Westland Row in Cumberland Street. Although part of the skyline is CGI, including the train tunnel arches which are not open in reality, there is a train station, Pearse Station behind the school with St Andrew's Church alongside.

As of series 2, production moved to Belgrade, Serbia, where it remains as of series 4.

References

External links
 

2020s British crime drama television series
2020s British mystery television series
2020s Irish television series
British detective television series
English-language television shows
Fiction set in 1882
Television series set in the 1880s
Television shows set in London
2020 British television series debuts
2020 Irish television series debuts
Victorian era in popular culture
UKTV original programming
Period television series